David Boston Barker (born 12 April 1943) is a British equestrian. He competed in two events at the 1964 Summer Olympics. His cousin is C. David Barker.

References

External links
 

1943 births
Living people
British male equestrians
Olympic equestrians of Great Britain
Equestrians at the 1964 Summer Olympics
Place of birth missing (living people)